Haley  is an English surname. It is based on a place name derived from Old English heg "hay" and leah "clearing or meadow", 

The surname Haley was found in County Sligo (Irish: Sligeach), in the province of Connacht in Northwestern Ireland, where they held a family seat from ancient times. The original form of Haley is O hEalaighthe, which is derived from the word "ealadhach," which means "ingenious." Another Gaelic form of the surname is O hEilidhe, which is derived from the word "eilidhe," which means "claimant".

Variant spellings include Heily, Hailey, Hayley, and Healy. The given name Hayley (which has many variant spellings) was derived from it. The family name Haley is also a variant spelling of the anglicized Irish Healy (surname).

People with the surname Haley
 Alex Haley (1921-1992), African American writer
 Andrew Haley (born 1974), Canadian Paralympic swimmer 
 Andrew Gallagher Haley (1904-1966), American lawyer.
 Bill Haley (1925-1981), American rock and roll musician
 Boyd Haley (born 1940), professor at the University of Kentucky
 Brian Haley (born 1963), American actor and stand-up comedian
 Cameron Hayley (born 1996), Canadian racing driver
 Carol Anne Haley (born 1972), Canadian politician
 Charles Haley (born 1964), American football linebacker
 Dan Haley (1940–2013), American football coach
 Dennis Haley (born 1982), linebacker for the Baltimore Ravens
 Ed Haley (1885-1951), American musician
 George Haley, American author and academic
 George W. Haley (1925-2015), American attorney, diplomat, and policy expert
 Gina Haley (born 1975), American singer-songwriter
 Graham Haley, African Canadian comedian
 Grant Haley (born 1979), American football player
 Harold Haley (1904-1970), murdered Californian judge
 Harold Haley (rugby league), rugby league footballer who played in the 1930s and 1940s
 Harry Hayley (1860–1922), English cricketer
 Jack Haley (1897-1979), American film actor
 Jack Haley (basketball) (1964-2015), American basketball player
 Jack Haley Jr. (1933-2001), American film director, producer and writer
 Jackie Earle Haley (born 1961), American actor
 James A. Haley (1899–1981), U.S. Representative from Florida
 J. Evetts Haley (1901–1995), American political activist, historian and author
 James Haley (born 1985), English rugby league footballer 
 James Haley, 19th century baseball player
 James L. Haley, American author of Texas history and fiction
 Jay Haley (1923-2007), American clinician
 Karen Hayley, British actress
 K. H. D. Haley (1920-1997), British historian
 Margaret Haley (1861-1939), former leader of the Chicago Teachers Federation
 Mary Hayley (1728–1808), English businesswoman
 Matt Haley (born 1970), comic book artist
 Michael Haley (rugby league) (born 1987), English rugby league footballer 
 Michael Haley (soldier), Major in the South Carolina National Guard and former First Gentlemen of South Carolina
 Micheal Haley (born 1986), ice hockey player
 Mike Haley (rugby union) (born 1994), Irish rugby union footballer
 Mike Hayley, British actor
 Nikki Haley (born 1972), American Republican politician and former United States Ambassador to the United Nations
 Paige Haley (born 1966), American bass guitarist with the band Orgy
 Paul Haley II (born 1988), American golfer
 Roddie Haley (1964–2022), American sprinter
 Shay Haley (born 1975), African American musician
 Thomas Alphonso Hayley (1780–1800), English sculptor, son of William Hayley (1745–1820)
 Todd Haley (born 1967), Head Coach, Kansas City Chiefs of the National Football League
 Usha Haley, Indian-born American author and academic
 William Haley (1901-1987), British newspaper editor and broadcasting administrator
 William Hayley (1745–1820), English writer
 William Hayley (priest) (1683–1715), dean of Chichester Cathedral and great-uncle of William Hayley (1745–1820)

Fictional People with the surname Hayley 

 Lauren Haley, a character in the TV series Supergirl

See also
Haley (disambiguation)
Hailey (surname)
Halley (surname), similar but unrelated name
Hayley (given name), with variant spellings
Haile (surname)

References

English-language surnames